Curry Without Worry is a San Francisco, California-based soup kitchen known for its menu of Nepalese cuisine. The charity serves free dinner to mostly impoverished persons on Tuesday afternoons from kiosks that simultaneously operate in San Francisco and Kathmandu. Curry Without Worry also encourages "successful people" to eat at its kiosks as a way to emphasize similarities between persons of different economic strata. Meals are vegan and typically include rice, kwati, curried vegetables, spicy achar, timur chutney and flatbread.

History 
Curry Without Worry was founded in 2006 by Shrawan Nepali, an immigrant to the United States from Nepal. Nepali used the profits from a San Francisco-area restaurant in which he was a part owner to start the organization.  The charity's president is Jesse Seaver.

References

Further reading
 Katayama, Lisa. "My love affair with timur (or how to cook a Nepali village feast)", Boing Boing, June 21, 2009. Retrieved January 31, 2014.

External links
 Curry Without Worry

Asian-American culture in San Francisco
Charities based in California
Nepalese American
Nepalese cuisine
Non-profit organizations based in San Francisco
Restaurants in San Francisco
Vegan cuisine